Hind Kesari is an Indian-style wrestling championship, established in 1958. It is affiliated to the Indian Style Wrestling Association of India (ISWAI). 

Hindi Kesari Title is a biggest Kushti Wrestling Title in India .

In 2011, women were allowed to compete for the first time.

Winners

References

Wrestling competitions in India
1958 establishments in India
Recurring sporting events established in 1958